Yevgeny Nikolayevich Edelson (12 october 1824, Ryazan, Russian Empire, - January 8, 1868, Saint Petersburg, Russian Empire) was a Russian literary critic, journalist, translator and philosopher, best known for his critical and philosophical essays published in Moskvityanin (where he, along with Alexander Ostrovsky among others was part of the "young faction", formed by Mikhail Pogodin), Pyotr Boborykin-led Biblioteka Dlya Chteniya (there he headed the literary criticism department) and Vsemirny Trud. Highly acclaimed were his translation of Gotthold Lessing's Laocoön and "Shchedrin and the New Satirical Literature" (both published in 1859), the first comprehensive analytical survey of Russian literary satire of the mid-19th century.

References

External links
 Yevgeny Edelson at Lib.ru (Russian)

1824 births
1869 deaths
People from Ryazan
Russian literary critics
Journalists from the Russian Empire
Russian male journalists
Male writers from the Russian Empire
Russian male essayists
19th-century translators from the Russian Empire
19th-century male writers from the Russian Empire
19th-century essayists